The All-Ireland Senior Hurling Championship of 1972 was the 85th staging of Ireland's premier hurling knock-out competition.  Kilkenny won the championship, beating Cork 3-24 to 5-11 in the final at Croke Park, Dublin.

Calendar

Format

Overview
The All-Ireland Senior Hurling Championship of 1972 was run on a provincial basis as usual.  It was a knockout tournament with pairings drawn at random in the respective provinces - there were no seeds.

Each match was played as a single leg. If a match was drawn there was a replay.  If that match ended in a draw a period of extra time was played, however, if both sides were still level at the end of extra time another replay had to take place.

Participating counties

The Championship

Munster Championship

Quarter-final: (1 match) This was a single match between the first two teams drawn from the province of Munster.

Semi-finals: (2 matches) The winner of the lone quarter-final joined the other three Munster teams to make up the semi-final pairings.

Final: (1 match) The winner of the two semi-finals contested this game.

Leinster Championship

First Round: (1 match) This was a single match between two of the 'weaker' teams drawn from the province of Leinster.

Quarter-finals: (2 matches) The winner of the first round game joined three other Leinster teams to make up the quarter-final pairings.

Semi-finals: (2 matches) The winners of the two quarter-finals joined Kilkenny and Wexford, who received a bye to this stage, to make up the semi-final pairings.

Final: (1 match) The winner of the two semi-finals contested this game.

All-Ireland Championship

Quarter-final: (1 match) This was a single match between Antrim and Galway, two teams who faced no competition in their respective provinces.

Semi-finals: (2 matches) The winner of the lone quarter-final joined London and the Munster and Leinster champions to make up the quarter-final pairings.  The provincial champions were drawn in opposite semi-finals.

Final: (1 match) The winner of the two semi-finals contested this game.

Fixtures

Leinster Senior Hurling Championship

Munster Senior Hurling Championship

All-Ireland Senior Hurling Championship

Championship statistics

Scoring

Widest winning margin: 27 points
Kilkenny 5-28 : 3-7 Galway (All-Ireland semi-final)
Most goals in a match: 12
Kilkenny 6-13 : 6-13 Wexford (Leinster final)
Most points in a match: 35
Kilkenny 3-24 : 5-11 Cork (All-Ireland final)
Kilkenny 5-28 : 3-7 Galway (All-Ireland semi-final)
Most goals by one team in a match: 7
Galway 7-16 : 4-7 Antrim (All-Ireland quarter-final)
Cork 7-20 : 1-12 London (All-Ireland semi-final)
Most goals scored by a losing team: 5
Cork 5-11 : 3-24 Kilkenny (All-Ireland final)
Most points scored by a losing team: 14 
Wexford 1-14 : 3-16 Kilkenny (Leinster final)

Top scorers

Season

Single game

Player facts

Debutantes

The following players made their début in the 1972 championship:

Retirees
The following players played their last game in the 1972 championship:

Stadia
The following stadia were used during the championship:

References

 Corry, Eoghan, The GAA Book of Lists (Hodder Headline Ireland, 2005).
 Donegan, Des, The Complete Handbook of Gaelic Games (DBA Publications Limited, 2005).
 Nolan, Pat, Flashbacks: A Half Century of Cork Hurling (The Collins Press, 2000).